Breithorn (elevation ) is a summit in the Steinernes Meer of the Berchtesgaden Alps in the Austrian state of Salzburg.

Alpinism 
The Breithorn stands 1300 m above Saalfelden, with neighbors Persailhorn and Mitterhorn to the West. To the North the plateau of the Steinernes Meer follows.

The fastest route to the summit is from the Riemann Hut (Riemannhaus) in about 1.5 hours.

Mountains of the Alps
Two-thousanders of Austria